Ismail Kouha (born 12 April 1983) is a football player from Morocco. He plays as goalkeeper.

Career
Kouha has played for several teams in Moroccan national leagues, especially in the top-tier Botola Pro, and for six months in Romania with Oțelul Galați in 2007.

References

External links
 

1983 births
Living people
Moroccan footballers
Association football goalkeepers
Raja CA players
Expatriate footballers in Romania
Moroccan expatriate sportspeople in Romania
ASC Oțelul Galați players
Liga I players